is a public university in Hiroshima Prefecture, Japan, established in 2005.

It has three campuses, located in these cities:
 Hiroshima (in the Ward of Minami)
 Shōbara
 Mihara

External links
 Official website 

Educational institutions established in 2005
Public universities in Japan
Universities and colleges in Hiroshima Prefecture
2005 establishments in Japan